Cladorhiza is a genus of carnivorous sponges, comprising around 40 species found in oceans around the world. Cladorhiza is the type genus of the family Cladorhizidae.

Description
Species of Cladorhiza occur in a diverse range of shapes, some ranging from globular to spherical to conical, with others attaining a tree-like or bush-like appearance. Many species have a narrow stalk or stem.  Most species range from 2 to 12 cm in height, with a few attaining heights of 20 to 40 cm.

Species
As of 2014, 40 valid species of Cladorhiza are recognized.

External links
 Merrick Ekins, Dirk Erpenbeck, Lisa Goudie, John N. A. Hooper: New carnivorous sponges and allied species from the Great Australian Bight. In: ZooTaxa Volume 4878, No. 2. Jan 2021. doi:10.11646/zootaxa.4878.2.2.

References

 
Cladorhizidae